Bäcklund is a Swedish-language surname.

Geographical distribution
As of 2014, 81.1% of all known bearers of the surname Bäcklund were residents of Sweden (frequency 1:5,653), 15.0% of Finland (1:17,018), 1.6% of Norway (1:151,246) and 1.2% of Denmark (1:217,098).

In Sweden, the frequency of the surname was higher than national average (1:5,653) in the following counties:
 1. Västerbotten County (1:1,145)
 2. Värmland County (1:1,825)
 3. Norrbotten County (1:1,991)
 4. Dalarna County (1:3,216)
 5. Västmanland County (1:4,323)
 6. Västernorrland County (1:4,784)
 7. Gävleborg County (1:5,092)
 8. Örebro County (1:5,282)

In Finland, the frequency of the surname was higher than national average (1:17,018) in the following regions:
 1. Åland (1:2,153)
 2. Ostrobothnia (1:3,476)
 3. Uusimaa (1:10,324)
 4. Southwest Finland (1:11,584)
 5. South Karelia (1:12,619)
 6. Tavastia Proper (1:13,928)

People
 Albert Victor Bäcklund (1845–1922), Swedish mathematician and physicist
 Magnus Bäcklund (1866–1903), Swedish missionary to Chinese Turkestan
 Magnus Bäcklund (born 1965), Swedish singer

References

Swedish-language surnames